Priesthood is the role or office of a priest.

Priesthood may also refer to:
 Priesthood (ancient Israel)
 Priesthood (Catholic Church)
 Priesthood (Community of Christ)
 Priesthood (Latter Day Saints)
 Priesthood (Eastern Orthodox Church)
 Priesthood (LDS Church)
 Priesthood (album), an album by Killah Priest